is a passenger railway station located in the city of Kami, Kōchi Prefecture, Japan. It is operated by JR Shikoku and has the station number "D36".

Lines

Layout
Shingai Station is one of two stations with switchback layout in Shikoku, the other being . The single side platform is on a siding located in the middle of a 25‰ gradient. Trains from  first enter the siding with the platform. Trains then reverse to the other siding, change direction again, and enter the main line toward . Trains that do not stop at the station do not use the sidings.

The station is unstaffed. A small building connected to the side platform serves as a waiting room.

Adjacent stations

History
 opened on 28 November 1935, and was converted to a passenger station on 1 June 1947. In preparation for the US invasion of the Japanese home islands, the area around Shinkai Signalbox was designated as a key point for the line of communication and was made into a military fortress. As the mountainous area was deemed a natural fortress, important facilities such as the Shikoku Military District Headquarters were temporarily established here. During the brief period until the end of the war, Shinkai Signalbox unexpectedly became the center of Kōchi prefecture.

With the privatization of Japanese National Railways (JNR) on 1 April 1987, the station came under the control of JR Shikoku.

Surrounding area
Yasuba Dam

See also
 List of Railway Stations in Japan

References

External links

 JR Shikoku timetable

Railway stations in Japan opened in 1947
Railway stations in Kōchi Prefecture
Kami, Kōchi